Kabud Kola (also Romanized as Kabūd Kolā) is a village in Dabuy-ye Jonubi Rural District, Dabudasht District, Amol County, Mazandaran Province, Iran. At the 2006 census, its population was 787, in 190 families.

References 

Populated places in Amol County